The year 2002 is the 14th year in the history of Shooto, a mixed martial arts promotion based in Japan. In 2002 Shooto held 21 events beginning with, Shooto: Treasure Hunt 1.

Title fights

Events list

Shooto: Treasure Hunt 1

Shooto: Treasure Hunt 1 was an event held on January 12, 2002 at Korakuen Hall in Tokyo, Japan.

Results

Shooto: Treasure Hunt 2

Shooto: Treasure Hunt 2 was an event held on January 25, 2002 at Kitazawa Town Hall in Setagaya, Tokyo, Japan.

Results

Shooto: Treasure Hunt 3

Shooto: Treasure Hunt 3 was an event held on February 11, 2002 at Kobe Fashion Mart in Kobe, Hyogo, Japan.

Results

Shooto: Gig East 8

Shooto: Gig East 8 was an event held on February 28, 2002 at Kitazawa Town Hall in Tokyo, Japan.

Results

Shooto: Treasure Hunt 4

Shooto: Treasure Hunt 4 was an event held on March 13, 2002 at Kitazawa Town Hall in Setagaya, Tokyo, Japan.

Results

Shooto: Treasure Hunt 5

Shooto: Treasure Hunt 5 was an event held on March 15, 2002 at Korakuen Hall in Tokyo, Japan.

Results

Shooto: Gig Central 1

Shooto: Gig Central 1 was an event held on March 31, 2002 at Nagoya Civic Assembly Hall in Nagoya, Aichi, Japan.

Results

Shooto: Wanna Shooto 2002

Shooto: Wanna Shooto 2002 was an event held on April 14, 2002 at Kitazawa Town Hall in Setagaya, Tokyo, Japan.

Results

Shooto: Wanna Shooto Japan

Shooto: Wanna Shooto Japan was an event held on April 21, 2002 at Kitazawa Town Hall in Setagaya, Tokyo, Japan.

Results

Shooto: Treasure Hunt 6

Shooto: Treasure Hunt 6 was an event held on May 5, 2002 at Korakuen Hall in Tokyo, Japan.

Results

Shooto: Gig East 9

Shooto: Gig East 9 was an event held on May 28, 2002 at Kitazawa Town Hall in Tokyo, Japan.

Results

Shooto: Treasure Hunt 7

Shooto: Treasure Hunt 7 was an event held on June 29, 2002 at The Kanaoka Park Gymnasium in Sakai, Osaka, Japan.

Results

Shooto: Treasure Hunt 8

Shooto: Treasure Hunt 8 was an event held on July 19, 2002 at Korakuen Hall in Tokyo, Japan.

Results

Shooto: Treasure Hunt 9

Shooto: Treasure Hunt 9 was an event held on July 27, 2002 at The Kitazawa Town Hall in Setagaya, Tokyo, Japan.

Results

Shooto: Gig East 10

Shooto: Gig East 10 was an event held on August 27, 2002 at Kitazawa Town Hall in Tokyo, Japan.

Results

Shooto: Treasure Hunt 10

Shooto: Treasure Hunt 10 was an event held on September 16, 2002 at The Yokohama Cultural Gymnasium in Yokohama, Kanagawa, Japan.

Results

Shooto: Gig East 11

Shooto: Gig East 11 was an event held on September 25, 2002 at Kitazawa Town Hall in Tokyo, Japan.

Results

Shooto: Gig Central 2

Shooto: Gig Central 2 was an event held on October 6, 2002 at The Nagoya Civic Assembly Hall in Nagoya, Aichi, Japan.

Results

Shooto: Gig West 3

Shooto: Gig West 3 was an event held on October 27, 2002 at The Namba Grand Kagetsu Studio in Osaka, Japan.

Results

Shooto: Treasure Hunt 11

Shooto: Treasure Hunt 11 was an event held on November 15, 2002 at Korakuen Hall in Tokyo, Japan.

Results

Shooto: Year End Show 2002

Shooto: Year End Show 2002 was an event held on December 14, 2002 at The Tokyo Bay NK Hall in Urayasu, Chiba, Japan.

Results

See also 
 Shooto
 List of Shooto champions
 List of Shooto Events

References

Shooto events
2002 in mixed martial arts